Christien Rioux, also known by his handle DilDog, is the co-founder and chief scientist for the Burlington, Massachusetts based company Veracode, for which he is the main patent holder.

Educated at MIT, Rioux was a computer security researcher at L0pht Heavy Industries and then at the company @stake (later bought by Symantec). While at @stake, he looked for security weaknesses in software and led the development of Smart Risk Analyzer (SRA). He co-authored the best-selling Windows password auditing tool @stake LC (L0phtCrack) and the AntiSniff network intrusion detection system.

He is also a member of Cult of the Dead Cow and its Ninja Strike Force. Formerly, he was a member of L0pht.

DilDog is best known as the author of the original code for Back Orifice 2000, an open source remote administration tool. He is also well known as the author of "The Tao of Windows Buffer Overflow."

References

People associated with computer security
Cult of the Dead Cow members
L0pht
Living people
Massachusetts Institute of Technology alumni
Computer programmers
Year of birth missing (living people)